The Ancient Monuments Consolidation and Amendment Act 1913 was an Act of the Parliament of the United Kingdom that aimed to improve the protection afforded to ancient monuments in Britain.

Details
The Ancient Monuments Protection Act 1882 had begun the process of establishing legal protection for some of Britain's ancient monuments; these had all been prehistoric sites, such as ancient tumuli. The Ancient Monuments Protection Act 1900 had continued this process, empowering the government's Commissioners of Work and local county councils to protect a wider range of properties. In 1908 a royal commission concluded that there were gaps between these two pieces of legislation, and the Ancient Monuments Protection Act 1910. These were felt to be unwieldy, and the Ancient Monuments Act repealed all three in 1913, replacing them with a new structure.

One of the main sponsors of the bill was the former viceroy George Curzon, 1st Marquess Curzon of Kedleston, who saved Tattershall Castle, Lincolnshire in 1911. Until then, owners of a building could do with it as they pleased. The experience left a deep impression on Lord Curzon, who became determined that new laws had to be put into place to protect Britain's heritage.

The new structure involved the creation of the Ancient Monuments Board to oversee the protection of such monuments. Powers were given for the board, with parliamentary approval, to issue preservation orders to protect monuments, and extended the public right of access to these. The term "monument" was extended to include the lands around it, allowing the protection of the wider landscape.

Consequences

By 1931, over 3,000 monuments had been listed with preservation orders, and over 200 taken into public ownership. Gaps in the legislation remained, however, leading to the passing of the Ancient Monuments Act 1931. However, both the 1913 Act and the 1931 Act were repealed in full by the Ancient Monuments and Archaeological Areas Act 1979.

Ecclesiastical exemption

A component of the 1913 Act that remains controversial to the present day is the ecclesiastical exemption from listed buildings control, covering all ecclesiastical buildings in ecclesiastical use. Subsequently, the Ecclesiastical Exemption (Listed Buildings and Conservation Areas) Order 1994 confined the exemption to denominations deemed to have suitable internal control mechanisms in place: the Church of England, the Church in Wales, the Methodist Church, the United Reformed Church, the Roman Catholic Church and the Baptist Union of Great Britain. Some heritage bodies have urged the exemption's abolition, arguing that it facilitates irreparable damage to historic church interiors in the name of renovation.  argued on behalf of The Victorian Society:

The Church of England General Synod has expressed the ecclesiastical position:

Bibliography

References

United Kingdom Acts of Parliament 1913
Archaeology of the United Kingdom
Archaeology law
Conservation in the United Kingdom